The Ambassador of Malaysia to the Kingdom of Cambodia is the head of Malaysia's diplomatic mission to Cambodia. The position has the rank and status of an Ambassador Extraordinary and Plenipotentiary and is based in the Embassy of Malaysia, Phnom Penh.

List of heads of mission

Chargé d'Affaires to Cambodia

Ambassadors to Cambodia

See also
 Cambodia–Malaysia relations

References 

 
Cambodia
Malaysia